Vodopyanovo is a rural locality (a selo) in Beryozovskoye Rural Settlement, Yelansky District, Volgograd Oblast, Russia. The population was 102 as of 2010. There are 5 streets.

Geography 
Vodopyanovo is located on Khopyorsko-Buzulukskaya Plain, on the Beryozovaya River, 17 km northeast of Yelan (the district's administrative centre) by road. Beryozovka is the nearest rural locality.

References 

Rural localities in Yelansky District